Joseph Kerridge (born September 17, 1992) is a former American football fullback. He played college football at Michigan. Kerridge was signed by the Washington Redskins as an undrafted free agent in 2016.

College career
Kerridge attended the University of Michigan, where he played on the Michigan Wolverines football team from 2011 to 2015. He was elected captain of the 2015 team by his teammates.

College statistics

Professional career

Washington Redskins
After going undrafted in the 2016 NFL Draft, Kerridge signed with the Washington Redskins on May 6, 2016. On September 3, 2016, he was waived by the Redskins during final team cuts. Kerridge was signed to the Redskins' practice squad the following day. On September 5, 2016, he was released by the Redskins.

Green Bay Packers
On October 3, 2016, Kerridge was signed to the Green Bay Packers' practice squad. He was promoted from the practice squad to the active roster on November 7, 2016.

On March 15, 2017, the Packers re-signed Kerridge. The contract was a one-year, $550,000 deal. He was released on September 8, 2017. He was signed to the Packers' practice squad on October 30, 2017. He was promoted to the active roster on November 18, 2017. He was waived on December 19, 2017 and re-signed to the practice squad. He was promoted back to the active roster on December 30, 2017.

He was re-signed on March 14, 2018. He was waived on September 1, 2018 and was signed to the practice squad the next day. He was released on October 30, 2018.

Cleveland Browns
On August 10, 2019, Kerridge was signed by the Cleveland Browns. Kerridge was waived with an injury designation on August 31, 2019, and subsequently reverted to injured reserve. He was waived from injured reserve on October 18.

NFL career statistics

Regular season

References

External links
Green Bay Packers bio
Washington Redskins bio
Michigan Wolverines bio

1992 births
Living people
American football fullbacks
Cleveland Browns players
Green Bay Packers players
Michigan Wolverines football players
Players of American football from Michigan
Sportspeople from Traverse City, Michigan
Washington Redskins players